The arrondissement of Soissons is an arrondissement of France in the Aisne department in the Hauts-de-France region. It has 164 communes.

Composition

The communes of the arrondissement of Soissons, and their INSEE codes are:
 
 Acy (02003)
 Aizy-Jouy (02008)
 Allemant (02010)
 Ambleny (02011)
 Ambrief (02012)
 Ancienville (02015)
 Arcy-Sainte-Restitue (02022)
 Audignicourt (02034) 
 Augy (02036)
 Bagneux (02043)
 Bazoches-et-Saint-Thibaut (02054)
 Belleu (02064)
 Bernoy-le-Château (02564)
 Berny-Rivière (02071)
 Beugneux (02082)
 Bieuxy (02087)
 Billy-sur-Aisne (02089)
 Billy-sur-Ourcq (02090)
 Blanzy-lès-Fismes (02091)
 Braine (02110)
 Braye (02118)
 Brenelle (02120)
 Breny (02121)
 Bruys (02129)
 Bucy-le-Long (02131)
 Buzancy (02138)
 Celles-sur-Aisne (02148)
 Cerseuil (02152)
 Chacrise (02154)
 Chassemy (02167)
 Chaudun (02172)
 Chavignon (02174)
 Chavigny (02175)
 Chavonne (02176)
 Chéry-Chartreuve (02179)
 Chivres-Val (02190)
 Chouy (02192)
 Ciry-Salsogne (02195)
 Clamecy (02198)
 Cœuvres-et-Valsery (02201)
 Condé-sur-Aisne (02210)
 Corcy (02216)
 Courcelles-sur-Vesle (02224)
 Courmelles (02226)
 Couvrelles (02230)
 Coyolles (02232)
 Cramaille (02233)
 Crouy (02243)
 Cuffies (02245)
 Cuiry-Housse (02249)
 Cuisy-en-Almont (02253)
 Cutry (02254)
 Cys-la-Commune (02255)
 Dammard (02258)
 Dampleux (02259)
 Dhuizel (02263)
 Dommiers (02267)
 Droizy (02272)
 Épagny (02277)
 Faverolles (02302)
 La Ferté-Milon (02307)
 Filain (02311)
 Fleury (02316)
 Fontenoy (02326)
 Grand-Rozoy (02665)
 Haramont (02368)
 Hartennes-et-Taux (02372)
 Jouaignes (02393)
 Juvigny (02398)
 Laffaux (02400)
 Largny-sur-Automne (02410)
 Launoy (02412)
 Laversine (02415)
 Lesges (02421)
 Leury (02424)
 Lhuys (02427)
 Limé (02432)
 Longpont (02438)
 Louâtre (02441)
 Maast-et-Violaine (02447)
 Macogny (02449)
 Margival (02464)
 Marizy-Sainte-Geneviève (02466)
 Marizy-Saint-Mard (02467)
 Mercin-et-Vaux (02477)
 Missy-aux-Bois (02485)
 Missy-sur-Aisne (02487)
 Monampteuil (02490) 
 Monnes (02496)
 Mont-Notre-Dame (02520)
 Mont-Saint-Martin (02523)
 Montgobert (02506)
 Montgru-Saint-Hilaire (02507)
 Montigny-Lengrain (02514)
 Morsain (02527)
 Mortefontaine (02528)
 Muret-et-Crouttes (02533)
 Nampteuil-sous-Muret (02536)
 Nanteuil-la-Fosse (02537)
 Neuville-sur-Margival (02551)
 Noroy-sur-Ourcq (02557)
 Nouvron-Vingré (02562)
 Oigny-en-Valois (02568)
 Osly-Courtil (02576)
 Ostel (02577)
 Oulchy-la-Ville (02579)
 Oulchy-le-Château (02580)
 Paars (02581)
 Parcy-et-Tigny (02585)
 Pargny-Filain (02589)
 Pasly (02593)
 Passy-en-Valois (02594)
 Pernant (02598)
 Le Plessier-Huleu (02606)
 Ploisy (02607)
 Pommiers (02610)
 Pont-Arcy (02612)
 Presles-et-Boves (02620)
 Puiseux-en-Retz (02628)
 Quincy-sous-le-Mont (02633)
 Ressons-le-Long (02643)
 Retheuil (02644)
 Rozières-sur-Crise (02663)
 Saconin-et-Breuil (02667)
 Saint-Bandry (02672)
 Saint-Christophe-à-Berry (02673)
 Saint-Mard (02682)
 Saint-Pierre-Aigle (02687)
 Saint-Rémy-Blanzy (02693)
 Sancy-les-Cheminots (02698)
 Septmonts (02706)
 Les Septvallons (02439)
 Serches (02711)
 Sermoise (02714)
 Serval (02715)
 Silly-la-Poterie (02718)
 Soissons (02722)
 Soucy (02729)
 Soupir (02730)
 Taillefontaine (02734)
 Tannières (02735)
 Tartiers (02736)
 Terny-Sorny (02739)
 Troësnes (02749)
 Vailly-sur-Aisne (02758)
 Vassens (02762) 
 Vasseny (02763)
 Vaudesson (02766)
 Vauxbuin (02770)
 Vauxrezis (02767)
 Vauxtin (02773)
 Venizel (02780)
 Vézaponin (02793)
 Vic-sur-Aisne (02795)
 Viel-Arcy (02797)
 Vierzy (02799)
 Ville-Savoye (02817)
 Villemontoire (02804)
 Villeneuve-Saint-Germain (02805)
 Villers-Cotterêts (02810)
 Villers-Hélon (02812)
 Vivières (02822)
 Vregny (02828)
 Vuillery (02829)

History

The arrondissement of Soissons was created in 1800. At the January 2017 reorganization of the arrondissements of Aisne, it received three communes from the arrondissement of Laon and 10 from the arrondissement of Château-Thierry.

As a result of the reorganisation of the cantons of France which came into effect in 2015, the borders of the cantons are no longer related to the borders of the arrondissements. The cantons of the arrondissement of Soissons were, as of January 2015:

 Braine
 Oulchy-le-Château
 Soissons-Nord
 Soissons-Sud
 Vailly-sur-Aisne
 Vic-sur-Aisne
 Villers-Cotterêts

References

Soissons